Jons is a commune in the Rhône department in Auvergne-Rhône-Alpes region in eastern France. Since 2008, Claude Villard has been the mayor of Jons. He was re-elected in the 2020 municipal elections.

See also
Communes of the Rhône department

References

Communes of Rhône (department)